Hoback may refer to:

Places
Hoback, Wyoming, a census-designated place in Teton County
Hoback River, a tributary of the Snake River

People with the surname
Cullen Hoback, American filmmaker
Randy Hoback, Canadian politician